Þrymskviða (Þrym's Poem; the name can be anglicised as Thrymskviða, Thrymskvitha, Thrymskvidha or Thrymskvida) is one of the best known poems from the Poetic Edda. The Norse myth had enduring popularity in Scandinavia and continued to be told and sung in several forms until the 19th century.

Synopsis

In the poem Þrymskviða, Thor wakes and finds that his powerful hammer, Mjöllnir, is missing. Thor turns to Loki first, and tells him that nobody knows that the hammer has been stolen. The two then go to the court of the goddess Freyja, and Thor asks her if he may borrow her feather cloak so that he may attempt to find Mjöllnir. Freyja agrees, saying she would lend it even if it were made of silver and gold, and Loki flies off, the feather cloak whistling.

In Jötunheimr, the jötunn Þrymr sits on a burial mound, plaiting golden collars for his female dogs, and trimming the manes of his horses. Þrymr sees Loki, and asks what could be amiss among the Æsir and the Elves; why is Loki alone in the Jötunheimr? Loki responds that he has bad news for both the elves and the Æsir: that Thor's hammer, Mjöllnir, is gone. Þrymr says that he has hidden Mjöllnir eight leagues beneath the earth, from which it will be retrieved if Freyja is brought to marry him. Loki flies off, the feather cloak whistling, away from Jötunheimr and back to the court of the gods.

Thor asks Loki if his efforts were successful, and that Loki should tell him while he is still in the air as "tales often escape a sitting man, and the man lying down often barks out lies". Loki states that it was indeed an effort, and also a success, for he has discovered that Þrymr has the hammer, but that it cannot be retrieved unless Freyja is brought to marry Þrymr. The two return to Freyja, and tell her to dress herself in a bridal head dress, as they will drive her to Jötunheimr. Freyja, indignant and angry, goes into a rage, causing all of the halls of the Æsir to tremble in her anger, and her necklace, the famed Brísingamen, falls from her. Freyja pointedly refuses.

As a result, the gods and goddesses meet and hold a thing to discuss and debate the matter. At the thing, the god Heimdallr puts forth the suggestion that, in place of Freyja, Thor should be dressed as the bride, complete with jewels, women's clothing down to his knees, a bridal head-dress, and the necklace Brísingamen. Thor rejects the idea, and Loki (here described as "son of Laufey") interjects that this will be the only way to get back Mjöllnir, and points out that without Mjöllnir, the jötnar will be able to invade and settle in Asgard. The gods dress Thor as a bride, and Loki states that he will go with Thor as his maid, and that the two shall drive to Jötunheimr together.

After riding together in Thor's goat-driven chariot, the two, disguised, arrive in Jötunheimr. Þrymr commands the jötnar in his hall to spread straw on the benches, for Freyja has arrived to marry him. Þrymr recounts his treasured animals and objects, stating that Freyja was all that he was missing in his wealth.

Early in the evening, the disguised Loki and Thor meet with Þrymr and the assembled jötnar. Thor eats and drinks ferociously, consuming entire animals and three casks of mead. Þrymr finds the behaviour at odds with his impression of Freyja, and Loki, sitting before Þrymr and appearing as a "very shrewd maid", makes the excuse that "Freyja's" behaviour is due to her having not consumed anything for eight entire days before arriving due to her eagerness to arrive. Þrymr then lifts "Freyja's" veil and wants to kiss "her" until catching the terrifying eyes staring back at him, seemingly burning with fire. Loki states that this is because "Freyja" had not slept for eight nights in her eagerness.

The "wretched sister" of the jötnar appears, asks for a bridal gift from "Freyja", and the jötnar bring out Mjöllnir to "sanctify the bride", to lay it on her lap, and marry the two by "the hand" of the goddess Vár. Thor laughs internally when he sees the hammer, takes hold of it, strikes Þrymr, beats all of the jötnar, and kills the "older sister" of the jötnar.

Analysis

There is no agreement among scholars on the age of Þrymskviða. Some have seen it as thoroughly heathen and among the oldest of the Eddaic poems, dating it to 900 AD. Others have seen it as a young Christian parody of the heathen gods.

In other tales, Loki's explanations for Thor's behavior has its clearest analogies in the tale Little Red Riding Hood, where the wolf provides equally odd explanations for its differences from the grandmother than  Little Red Riding Hood was expecting.

Songs
Parts of the story related in Þrymskviða remained in the Thor song, a song which is known from Scandinavia and of which there are Swedish accounts from the 17th century to the 19th century. In this song, Thor is called Torkar, Loki is called Locke Lewe, Freyja is called Miss Frojenborg and Þrymr is called Trolletrams.

A 15th century Icelandic rímur cycle, Þrymlur, relates the same story and is evidently based on Þrymskviða.

Opera 
The first full-length Icelandic opera, Jón Ásgeirsson's Þrymskviða, was premiered at Iceland's National Theater in 1974. The libretto is based on the text of the poem Þrymskviða, but also incorporates material from several other Eddic poems.

Icelandic statue

A seated bronze statue of Thor (about 6.4 cm) known as the Eyrarland statue from about AD 1000 was recovered at a farm near Akureyri, Iceland and is a featured display at the National Museum of Iceland. Thor is holding Mjöllnir, sculpted in the typically Icelandic cross-like shape. It has been suggested that the statue is related to a scene from Þrymskviða where Thor recovers his hammer while seated by grasping it with both hands during the wedding ceremony.

References

Other sources
Schön, Ebbe. Asa-Tors hammare. Fälth & Hässler, Värnamo 2004.

External links

 Þrymskviða in Old Norse from heimskringla.no

 The Scandinavian Thor songs and Þrymlur from heimskringla.no

 An English translation of Þrymskviða
 Text of Þrymskviða with an English marginal glossary
 MyNDIR (My Norse Digital Image repository) illustrations from Victorian and Edwardian  retellings of Þrymskviða. Clicking on the thumbnail will give you the full image and information concerning it.

Eddic poetry
Sources of Norse mythology